O Jerusalem! is a history book published in 1971 by Dominique Lapierre and Larry Collins that seeks to capture the events and mishaps surrounding the creation of Israel, and the subsequent mass expulsion of Palestinians.

Introduction

The book is the result of two years of research by the authors, which consisted of several thousand interviews, and an examination of a series of publicly available documents and relevant materials. These became the basic materials for presenting the story of the birth of the modern state of Israel.

Presentation

The book has forty-six chapters, grouped into four parts:
Part One: A Time to Mourn and a Time to Dance has six chapters.
Part Two: A House Against Itself has eleven chapters.
Part Three: A City Besieged has thirteen chapters.
Part Four: A City Divided has sixteen chapters.

References

Collins, Larry and Lapierre, Dominique (1972): O Jerusalem!, Simon & Schuster, .

1972 non-fiction books
Books about the Arab–Israeli conflict
Books adapted into films
Books about Jerusalem
Non-fiction novels
1948 Arab–Israeli War